Ljubić may refer to:

 Ljubić (surname)
 Ljubić, Vitez, a village in Bosnia and Herzegovina
 Ljubić (Čačak), Serbia
 Battle of Ljubić, 1815
 Ljubić (Knić), Serbia